Kowall is a surname. Notable bearers include:

 Eileen Kowall (born 1952), American politician, wife of Mike
 Mike Kowall (born 1951), American politician, husband of Eileen

See also
 
 Kowal (disambiguation)
 Kowalski
 Cowell (surname)

Polish-language surnames